Karelichy District is a district (rajon) in Grodno Region of Belarus.

The administrative center is Karelichy.

Notable residents 
 Jan Bułhak (1876, Astašyn village –1950), photographer, ethnographer and folklorist
 Ignacy Domeyko (1802, Miadzviedka estate – 1889), geologist, mineralogist, educator, and founder of the University of Santiago, in Chile
 Archimandrite Leo Garoshka(1911, Traščycy village – 1977), Catholic priest of the Byzantine rite, religious and social activist, researcher of the history of religion in Belarus and anfounder of the Francis Skaryna Belarusian Library in London.
 Barys Rahula (1920, Turec village – 2005) was a Belarusian political activist

References 

 
Districts of Grodno Region